Menzus Raynard Bump (May 28, 1838May 6, 1913) was an American businessman and Republican politician.  He served one term in the Wisconsin State Assembly, representing Dunn and Pepin counties, and was a Union Army volunteer in the American Civil War.

Biography
Bump was born in Granville, New York. He moved to Mondovi, Wisconsin, before settling in Rock Creek, Wisconsin, in 1868.

During the American Civil War, Bump served in the 25th Wisconsin Infantry Regiment of the Union Army. Engagements he took part in include the Battle of Resaca of the Atlanta Campaign. He achieved the rank of first sergeant.

Bump married Elma A. Crocker on November 1, 1868, in Eau Claire County, Wisconsin. They had three children. Bump was designated postmaster of Caryville, Wisconsin, in 1882. Bump died on May 6, 1913, in Spokane, Washington.

Political career
Bump was a member of the Assembly in 1876. Additionally, he was Chairman of the Board of Rock Creek. He was a Republican.

References

External links

People from Granville, New York
People from Mondovi, Wisconsin
People from Dunn County, Wisconsin
Republican Party members of the Wisconsin State Assembly
People of Wisconsin in the American Civil War
Union Army soldiers
1838 births
1913 deaths
Burials in Washington (state)
19th-century American politicians